Ernő Noskó (born 26 May 1945) was a Hungarian football player who played for Újpesti Dózsa. Noskó is most famous for his participation in the gold medal-winning Hungarian team on the 1968 Summer Olympics,. He played 15 games for the Hungarian national team.

References

1945 births
Living people
Hungarian footballers
Hungary international footballers
Olympic footballers of Hungary
Olympic gold medalists for Hungary
Footballers at the 1968 Summer Olympics
Association football midfielders
Újpest FC players
Olympic medalists in football
Medalists at the 1968 Summer Olympics